Sir Geoffrey Holt Seymour Jackson  (4 March 1915 – 1 October 1987) was a British diplomat and writer.

Background and earlier career
Jackson received his education at Bolton School and Emmanuel College, Cambridge. He entered the Foreign Service in 1937 and served in Beirut, Cairo, Baghdad, Basra, Bogotá and Berne before being appointed Minister to Honduras in 1956. The next year he was promoted to ambassador when the post was upgraded. He was Consul-General at Seattle for the north-western US states 1960–64 and Minister (Commercial) in Toronto 1965–69.

HM Ambassador to Uruguay

In 1969 he became ambassador in Uruguay. He was kidnapped by Tupamaros guerrillas in 1970, enduring a captivity of nine months. Released in September 1971, he retired at the end of 1972 with the honorary rank of Deputy Under-Secretary of State at the Foreign Office, having served for 35 years in the diplomatic service, of which 31 had been spent abroad.

Kidnapping
Jackson was kidnapped by Tupamaros guerrillas on 8 January 1971 in Montevideo, Uruguay. He was released after eight months of captivity, on 9 September 1971. Three decades later it became known that Edward Heath, the UK Prime Minister at that time, negotiated a deal for Jackson's release, brokered by Salvador Allende, President of Chile, who was in contact with the Tupamaros rebels. £42,000 was paid for Jackson's release.

Later life

He served for five years, 1976–80, on the BBC's General Advisory Council (abolished in the 1990s) and was chairman of a BBC advisory group on the social effects of television.

Honours
Geoffrey Jackson was appointed CMG in the New Year Honours of 1963 and knighted KCMG in 1971 after his release from captivity.

Books

References 
JACKSON, Sir Geoffrey (Holt Seymour), Who Was Who, A & C Black, 1920–2008; online edn, Oxford University Press, Dec 2012

Notes

External links 
The Papers of Sir Geoffrey Jackson held at Churchill Archives Centre
BBC – Desert Island Discs – Castaway : Sir Geoffrey Jackson, 8 April 1972, with photo

1915 births
1970 crimes in Uruguay
1987 deaths
Ambassadors of the United Kingdom to Uruguay
Ambassadors of the United Kingdom to Honduras
BBC people
British writers
Kidnapped British people
Kidnapped diplomats
Knights Commander of the Order of St Michael and St George
People educated at Bolton School
Alumni of Emmanuel College, Cambridge
Terrorism in Uruguay